, also known as Tachibanakan Triangle or Love to Lie Angle, is a Japanese yuri manga series by Merryhachi. It was serialized in Ichijinsha's Comic Yuri Hime magazine from November 2014 to April 2020. The manga is licensed in North America by Digital Manga Publishing. An anime television series adaptation by Creators in Pack and Studio Lings premiered on April 4, 2018.

Characters

Media

Manga
Tachibanakan To Lie Angle is written and illustrated by Merryhachi. It was serialized in Ichijinsha's Comic Yuri Hime magazine from the January 2015 issue sold on November 18, 2014 to the June 2020 issue sold on April 17, 2020. The ninth and last volume was published on June 30, 2020. The manga is licensed in North America by Digital Manga Publishing.

Anime
A 12-episode anime television series adaptation by Creators in Pack and Studio Lings premiered on April 4, 2018. The series is directed by Hisayoshi Hirasawa, with series composition by Words in Stereo and character design by Yutsuko Hanai. Crunchyroll is simulcasting the series.

Notes

References

External links
 

Anime series based on manga
Creators in Pack
Crunchyroll anime
Digital Manga Publishing titles
Ichijinsha manga
Japanese LGBT-related animated television series
Yuri (genre) anime and manga